Who Killed Little Gregory? is a 2019 documentary streaming television mini-series. The premise revolves around the murder of 4-year-old Grégory Villemin in 1984. The case became a media spectacle in France, and no killer has ever been identified.

Cast 
 Page Leong as Marie-Christine Chastant-Morano
 William Salyers as Etienne Sesmat
 James Simenc as Jean-Marie Villemin
 Peter James Smith as Gerard Welzer
 Jayne Taini as Edith Gaudin

Release 
Who Killed Little Gregory? was released on November 20, 2019, on Netflix.

References

External links
 
 

2019 French television series debuts
2010s documentary television series
French-language television shows
Netflix original documentary television series
2019 French television series endings